Pat Hyland (born in Victoria) is an Australian retired jockey and current horse trainer who is best known for riding What A Nuisance to victory in the 1985 Melbourne Cup. His son, Chris Hyland, is also a successful horse trainer.

References

Australian jockeys
Australian racehorse trainers
People from Victoria (Australia)
Living people
Australian Thoroughbred Racing Hall of Fame inductees
Year of birth missing (living people)